Trailblazers is a racing video game developed by British studio Supergonk and published by Rising Star Games for Microsoft Windows, PlayStation 4, Xbox One, and Nintendo Switch in May 2018.

Gameplay
Trailblazers is a high-speed racing game that has been compared to games like Wipeout, F-Zero, and Splatoon. Players control one of eight different racers, with each racer's vehicle capable of painting their team's colour on the track, create boost pads for the team. Teams in each race can have up to three racers each.

Development
Trailblazers was developed by Supergonk, a studio consisting of developers who had previously worked at studios like Codemasters, Bizarre Creations, and Lionhead Studios.

In May 2018, a trailer was released for the game to celebrate the launch of the game.

Reception
In a hands-on preview in March 2018, Blake Morse of Shack News praised the visuals, comparing the graphics to Borderlands.

The Windows, PlayStation 4, and Xbox One versions of Trailblazers received "mixed or average" reviews, according to review aggregator Metacritic. Martin Robinson of Eurogamer criticized the game for its poor "energy".

References

External links
 

2018 video games
Nintendo Switch games
PlayStation 4 games
Racing video games
Video games developed in the United Kingdom
Windows games
Xbox One games
Rising Star Games games
Multiplayer and single-player video games